The NCAA Division II men's basketball tournament (officially styled by the NCAA as a "Championship" instead of a "Tournament") is an annual championship tournament for colleges and universities that are members of NCAA Division II, a grouping of schools in the United States (plus one school in Canada) that are generally smaller than the higher-profile institutions grouped in Division I. The tournament, originally known as the NCAA College Division Basketball Championship, was established in 1957, immediately after the NCAA subdivided its member schools into the University Division (today's Division I) and College Division. It became the Division II championship in 1974, when the NCAA split the College Division into the limited-scholarship Division II and the non-scholarship Division III, and added the "Men's" designation in 1982 when the NCAA began sponsoring a Division II women's championship.

Like all other NCAA basketball divisions for men and women, the champion is decided in a single-elimination tournament.  The Division II tournament normally involves 64 teams.  The Division II tournaments for men and women differ in a major respect from those in Divisions I and III. The finals of both Division II tournaments consist of eight teams, instead of the four in the other two divisions. The eight survivors of regional play meet in the Elite Eight at a predetermined site.

Qualification
A total of 64 bids are normally available for each tournament: 23 automatic bids (awarded to the champion of each Division II all-sports conference) and 41 at-large bids. Due to COVID-19 issues, the 2020 tournament was canceled, and the 2021 tournament was reduced to 48 teams when nine all-sports conferences chose not to compete in men's basketball in 2020–21.

The bids are allocated evenly among the eight NCAA-designated regions (Atlantic, Central, East, Midwest, South, South Central, Southeast, and West), all but one of which contain three of the 23 Division II conferences that sponsor men's basketball. The South Central region contains only two conferences. Each regional tournament involves an appropriate number of automatic qualifiers (teams that won their respective conference tournaments), with the remaining participants entering via at-large bids (which are awarded regardless of conference affiliation).

Conference tournaments

 The Heartland Conference disbanded after the 2018–19 season, with seven of its nine members moving to the Lone Star Conference and the other two joining the Mid-America Intercollegiate Athletics Association. Its tournament was discontinued.

Results

Source:

Records and statistics

Championships by school

Team appearances

Former Division II champions now in Division I
Source:

Former Division II champions now in Division III
Source:

Statistical Leaders 
 NCAA Division II season scoring leaders

Broadcasting 
CBS Sports holds rights to the semi-final and final rounds of the Division II tournament, with the semi-final games broadcast on CBS Sports Network and the final on CBS (covered as part of the NCAA March Madness package). In 2015, CBS Sports reached a long-term deal to continue broadcasting the Division II men's semi-final on CBS Sports Network through 2024.

See also
 NCAA Division II women's basketball tournament
 NCAA Division I men's basketball tournament
 NCAA Division III men's basketball tournament
 NAIA Division I men's basketball tournament
 NAIA Division II men's basketball tournament

References

External links
 Awards history through 2020-2021 (Archived)
 Coaching records through 2020-2021 (Archived)
 Attendance records through 2020-2021 (Archived)

 
Recurring sporting events established in 1957